Radio 4 may refer to:

 BBC Radio 4, a British radio station
 BBC Radio 4 Extra, BBC Radio 4's sister station
 NPO Radio 4, a Dutch radio station
 Radio 4 (band), a New York dance-punk band